The Manajeba River is located in northern Madagascar. Its sources are situated near in the Tsaratanana Massif, it crosses the Route nationale 6 near Tanambao Marivorahona and flows into the Indian Ocean.

In January 2012 the bridge of 32 meters of the Route nationale 6 collapsed between Tanambao Marivorahona and the village of Marivorahona.

References  
Bauduin & Servat, Etude d'Hydrologie à usage Agricole - ORSTOM pp.1-829 - page 29

Rivers of Madagascar
Rivers of Diana Region